Indeterminate cell histiocytosis is a cutaneous condition felt to be caused by dermal precursors of Langerhans cells.

See also 
 Non-X histiocytosis
 List of cutaneous conditions

References

External links 

Monocyte- and macrophage-related cutaneous conditions